Pseudocollix is a genus of moths in the family Geometridae.

Species
Pseudocollix hyperythra (Hampson, 1895)
Pseudocollix kawamurai (Inoue, 1972)

References

External links
Natural History Museum Lepidoptera genus database

Melanthiini
Taxa named by William Warren (entomologist)